The women's shot put event  at the 1977 European Athletics Indoor Championships was held on 13 March in San Sebastián. Helena Fibingerová's winning mark of 21.46 metres as of 2019 is the longest standing European Athletics Indoor Championships record.

Results

References

Shot put at the European Athletics Indoor Championships
Shot
Euro